Cyathocotylidae is a family of trematodes in the order Diplostomida.

Genera
Holostephanus Szidat, 1936
Mesostephanus Lutz, 1935
Neogogatea Chandler & Rausch, 1947
Paracoenogonimus Katsurada, 1914
Prohemistomum Odhner, 1913
Pseudhemistomum Szidat, 1936

References

Diplostomida
Trematode families